The Journal of Health Communication is a monthly peer-reviewed scientific journal covering health communication.

Background

The journal was established in 1996 and is published by Taylor & Francis. The editor-in-chief is Scott C. Ratzan (John F. Kennedy School of Government). Special projects editor is Kenneth H. Rabin. According to the Journal Citation Reports, the journal has a 2017 impact factor of 1.648, ranking it 21st out of 79 journals in the category "Communication (Social Science)" and 29th out of 85 journals in the category "Information Science & Library Science (Social Science)". As part of its mission, the Journal takes editorial positions on important issues in the field, such as vaccine confidence.

References

External links

Publications established in 1996
Taylor & Francis academic journals
Communication journals
Monthly journals
English-language journals
Health policy journals
Health communication